"Community" is the seventh episode of the television series Fear Itself, the episode originally aired on July 24, 2008. The plot revolves around a young couple move into a secure gated community and discover its horrifying secret.

Synopsis 
Bobby and Tracy are a young couple who have decided to move from a big city to The Commons, a suburban gated community. They are enthusiastic about the move, as Tracy desperately wants children, however their friends Meryl and Scott are mixed about the community. Meryl likes idea of Commons while Scott is highly apprehensive.  When signing the contract for their new house, Bobby and Tracy neglect to read the fine print, which contains some fairly specific rules and the repercussions if they are broken.

While things seem initially idyllic, the couple soon uncover the community's sinister side. Indiscretions are punished harshly, as an adulterous woman is publicly shamed and forced to wear a pig mask while a man complaining about the Commons is hauled away by other men. They discover that there are cameras in every home that broadcast footage that everyone within the community can view whenever they want, giving them no privacy. The couple is approached by the Commons HOA president, who asks when they will have their first child as the fine print on the contract specifies that they must have a child within six months of moving in or their home will be foreclosed. Tracy manages to conceive, saving them from losing the house.

Ultimately Bobby decides that they must leave the community and has Tracy leave on her own before he flees on foot. He's chased by the others in the community and is eventually caught. The episode cuts to five years later. Tracy is now the president of the HOA and is welcoming new people into the community. Bobby watches from within their home, as he is now a wheelchair user after having amputated his legs.

Filming locations
The episode was filmed in Edmonton, Alberta, Canada.

Reception 
The A.V. Club reviewed "Community" as B+, calling it "another strong episode for me, the best since Stuart Gordon's grisly Week Five entry "Eater."" Reviewers for JoBlo's Arrow in the Head were mixed, as some enjoyed it while others panned it as lacking tension. Dread Central and Slant both panned the episode. Slant noted that the episode's twist was similar to that of Thomas Tryon's Harvest Home, noting that the episode lacked "the power of that novel's symbolic castration."

References

External links

2008 American television episodes